Kruhlaye District (Kruglyansky raion) is a raion (district) in Mogilev Region, Belarus, the administrative center is the urban-type settlement of Kruhlaye. As of 2009, its population was 15,761. Population of Kruhlaye accounts for 47.8% of the district's population.

References

 
Districts of Mogilev Region